Martin Hellgren (born April 1, 1991) is a Swedish professional ice hockey player. He played with Brynäs IF in the Elitserien during the 2010–11 Elitserien season.

References

External links

1991 births
Brynäs IF players
Living people
Swedish ice hockey centres